The Prime Minister of Senegal is the head of government of Senegal. The Prime Minister is appointed by the President of Senegal, who is directly elected for a five-year term. The Prime Minister, in turn, appoints the Senegalese cabinet, after consultation with the President.

The following is a list of prime ministers of Senegal, since the country gained independence from France in 1960.

Future of post
On 6 April 2019, after being reappointed by President Macky Sall, Prime Minister Mohammed Dionne announced that President Sall had tasked him with enacting various government reforms, including the elimination of the job of Prime Minister. Sall's goal was to remove the "intermediary level" of Prime Minister to allow the President to take a more hands-on approach to governing.

In November 2021, Macky Sall announced the return of the post of prime minister suppressed since 2019.

Key 
Political parties

Other factions

List of officeholders

See also
Senegal 
President of Senegal
List of colonial governors of Senegal
Politics of Senegal 
Lists of office-holders

References

External links
World Statesmen - Senegal

Government ministers of Senegal
History of Senegal
Senegal, Prime Minister
 
Prime Minister